Warstones Wanderers Football Club is a football club based in Wolverhampton, West Midlands, England.

History
The club was established in 2001 as an under-10 team. An adult Saturday team was established and entered the Wolverhampton & District Combination in 2005. After their first season they were accepted into Division Two of the West Midlands (Regional) League. Despite only finishing seventh in their first season in the division, they were promoted to Division One as the division was increased in size. In 2008–09 they entered the FA Vase for the first time, beating Cradley Town 2–1 on penalties in the second qualifying round before losing 4–0 to Long Eaton United in the first round.

In 2012–13 the club resigned from the league midway through the season. However, they were readmitted to Division Two for the 2013–14 season.

Ground
When the club joined the West Midlands (Regional) League they played at Parkfields Stadium. However, they began their second season in the league without a home ground, before moving to Wyrley Rangers' Long Lane Park in Essington. The club moved again for the 2008–09, groundsharing at Sporting Khalsa's Abbey Stadium. In 2010 they moved to Bloxwich United's Old Red Lion Ground, before moving to the Goodrich Sports Ground in 2011. By 2013 they were playing at the Aldersley Leisure Village.

Records
Best FA Vase performance: First round, 2008–09

References

External links
Official website

Football clubs in England
Football clubs in the West Midlands (county)
Association football clubs established in 2001
2001 establishments in England
Sport in Wolverhampton
West Midlands (Regional) League